This list shows the IUCN Red List status of mammal species occurring in Croatia. Seven of them are vulnerable and four are near threatened.
The following tags are used to highlight each species' conservation status as assessed on the respective IUCN Red List published by the International Union for Conservation of Nature:

Some species were assessed using an earlier set of criteria. Species assessed using this system have the following instead of near threatened and least concern categories:

Order: Rodentia (rodents)

Rodents make up the largest order of mammals, with over 40% of mammalian species. They have two incisors in the upper and lower jaw which grow continually and must be kept short by gnawing.
Family: Castoridae (beavers)
Genus: Castor
Eurasian beaver, C. fiber 
Family: Echimyidae
Genus: Myocastor
Nutria, M. coypus  introduced
Family: Sciuridae (squirrels)
Subfamily: Sciurinae
Tribe: Sciurini
Genus: Sciurus
 Red squirrel, S. vulgaris 
Subfamily: Xerinae
Tribe: Marmotini
Genus: Marmota
 Alpine marmot, M. marmota 
Genus: Spermophilus
 European ground squirrel, S. citellus  extirpated
Family: Gliridae (dormice)
Subfamily: Leithiinae
Genus: Dryomys
 Forest dormouse, Dryomys nitedula NT
Genus: Eliomys
Garden dormouse, E. quercinus 
Genus: Muscardinus
 Hazel dormouse, Muscardinus avellanarius LC
Subfamily: Glirinae
Genus: Glis
 European edible dormouse, G. glis LC
Family: Cricetidae
Subfamily: Arvicolinae
Genus: Arvicola
European water vole, A. amphibius 
Genus: Chionomys
 Snow vole, Chionomys nivalis NT
Genus: Clethrionomys
 Bank vole, Clethrionomys glareolus LC
Genus: Cricetus
 European hamster, C. cricetus  presence uncertain
Genus: Dinaromys
 Balkan snow vole, Dinaromys bogdanovi NT
Genus: Microtus
 Field vole, Microtus agrestis LC
 Common vole, Microtus arvalis LC
 European pine vole, Microtus subterraneus LC
Family: Muridae (mice, rats, voles, gerbils, hamsters, etc.)
Subfamily: Murinae
Genus: Apodemus
 Striped field mouse, Apodemus agrarius LC
 Yellow-necked mouse, Apodemus flavicollis LC
 Broad-toothed field mouse, Apodemus mystacinus LC
 Wood mouse, Apodemus sylvaticus LC
 Ural field mouse, Apodemus uralensis LC
Genus: Micromys
 Eurasian harvest mouse, Micromys minutus LC
Genus: Mus
 Steppe mouse, Mus spicilegus LC

Order: Lagomorpha (lagomorphs)

The lagomorphs comprise two families, Leporidae (hares and rabbits), and Ochotonidae (pikas). Though they can resemble rodents, and were classified as a superfamily in that order until the early 20th century, they have since been considered a separate order. They differ from rodents in a number of physical characteristics, such as having four incisors in the upper jaw rather than two.

Family: Leporidae (rabbits, hares)
Genus: Lepus
European hare, L. europaeus 
Genus: Oryctolagus
European rabbit, O. cuniculus  introduced

Order: Erinaceomorpha (hedgehogs and gymnures)

The order Erinaceomorpha contains a single family, Erinaceidae, which comprise the hedgehogs and gymnures. The hedgehogs are easily recognised by their spines while gymnures look more like large rats.
Family: Erinaceidae (hedgehogs)
Subfamily: Erinaceinae
Genus: Erinaceus
West European hedgehog, E. europaeus

Order: Soricomorpha (shrews, moles, and solenodons)

The "shrew-forms" are insectivorous mammals. The shrews and solenodons closely resemble mice while the moles are stout-bodied burrowers.
Family: Soricidae (shrews)
Subfamily: Crocidurinae
Genus: Crocidura
 Bicolored shrew, C. leucodon 
Lesser white-toothed shrew, C. suaveolens 
Subfamily: Soricinae
Tribe: Nectogalini
Genus: Neomys
 Southern water shrew, N. anomalus 
 Eurasian water shrew, N. fodiens 
Tribe: Soricini
Genus: Sorex
 Alpine shrew, S. alpinus 
 Common shrew, S. araneus

Order: Chiroptera (bats)

The bats' most distinguishing feature is that their forelimbs are developed as wings, making them the only mammals capable of flight. Bat species account for about 20% of all mammals.
Family: Vespertilionidae
Subfamily: Myotinae
Genus: Myotis
Bechstein's bat, M. bechsteini 
 Long-fingered bat, M. capaccinii  
 Geoffroy's bat, M. emarginatus  
Subfamily: Vespertilioninae
Genus: Barbastella
Western barbastelle, B. barbastellus 
Genus: Nyctalus
 Greater noctule bat, Nyctalus lasiopterus
 Lesser noctule, Nyctalus leisleri
Subfamily: Miniopterinae
Genus: Miniopterus
Common bent-wing bat, M. schreibersii 
Family: Rhinolophidae
Subfamily: Rhinolophinae
Genus: Rhinolophus
Mediterranean horseshoe bat, R. euryale 
Greater horseshoe bat, R. ferrumequinum 
Lesser horseshoe bat, R. hipposideros 
Mehely's horseshoe bat, R. mehelyi

Order: Cetacea (whales)
The order Cetacea includes whales, dolphins and porpoises. They are the mammals most fully adapted to aquatic life with a spindle-shaped nearly hairless body, protected by a thick layer of blubber, and forelimbs and tail modified to provide propulsion underwater.

Suborder: Mysticeti
Family: Balaenopteridae
Genus: Balaenoptera (rorquals)
 Common minke whale, B. acutorostrata  
 Fin whale, B. physalus 
Subfamily: Megapterinae
Genus: Megaptera
 Humpback whale, Megaptera novaeangliae LC
Suborder: Odontoceti
Family: Physeteridae (sperm whales)
Genus: Physeter
 Sperm whale, Physeter macrocephalus VU
Superfamily: Platanistoidea
Family: Delphinidae (marine dolphins)
Genus: Tursiops
 Common bottlenose dolphin, Tursiops truncatus DD
Genus: Stenella
 Striped dolphin, Stenella coeruleoalba LR/cd
Genus: Delphinus
 Short-beaked common dolphin, Delphinus delphis LR/lc 
Genus: Grampus
 Risso's dolphin, Grampus griseus DD

Order: Carnivora (carnivorans)

There are over 260 species of carnivorans, the majority of which eat meat as their primary dietary item. They have a characteristic skull shape and dentition.
Suborder: Feliformia
Family: Felidae (cats)
Subfamily: Felinae
Genus: Felis
 European wildcat, F. silvestris 
Genus: Lynx
 Eurasian lynx, L. lynx 
Family: Herpestidae
Genus: Urva
 Small Indian mongoose, U. auropunctata  introduced 
Suborder: Caniformia
Family: Canidae (dogs, foxes)
Genus: Canis
 Golden jackal, C. aureus 
 Gray wolf, C. lupus 
Genus: Nyctereutes
Raccoon dog, N. procyonoides  introduced
Genus: Vulpes
 Red fox, V. vulpes 
Genus: Procyon
Raccoon, P. lotor
Family: Ursidae (bears)
Genus: Ursus
 Brown bear, U. arctos 
Family: Mustelidae (mustelids)
Genus: Lutra
European otter, L. lutra 
Genus: Martes
 Beech marten, M. foina 
European pine marten, M. martes
Genus: Meles
 European badger, M. meles 
Genus: Mustela
 Stoat, M. erminea 
 European mink, M. lutreola  extirpated
 Least weasel, M. nivalis 
 European polecat, M. putorius 
Family: Phocidae (earless seals)
Genus: Monachus
 Mediterranean monk seal, M. monachus

Order: Artiodactyla (even-toed ungulates)

The even-toed ungulates are ungulates whose weight is borne about equally by the third and fourth toes, rather than mostly or entirely by the third as in perissodactyls. There are about 220 artiodactyl species, including many that are of great economic importance to humans.
Family: Cervidae (deer)
Subfamily: Capreolinae
Genus: Capreolus
Roe deer, C. capreolus 
Subfamily: Cervinae
Genus: Axis
Chital, A. axis  introduced
Genus: Cervus
Red deer, C. elaphus 
Genus: Dama
European fallow deer, D. dama 
Family: Bovidae
Subfamily: Caprinae
Genus: Rupicapra
Northern chamois, R. rupicapra 
Family: Suidae (pigs)
Subfamily: Suinae
Genus: Sus
Wild boar, S. scrofa

See also
List of chordate orders
Lists of mammals by region
List of prehistoric mammals
Mammal classification
List of mammals described in the 2000s

References

External links

Croatia
Mammals
Mammals
Croatia